The Boundary Ford Curling Classic is an annual bonspiel, or curling tournament, that takes place every November at the Lloydminster Golf and Curling Centre in Lloydminster, Saskatchewan. The tournament, started in 2007 as part of the women's World Curling Tour, is held in a triple knockout format.

Women's winners

References

External links

Curling in Saskatchewan
Women's World Curling Tour events
Sport in Lloydminster